Mark Thomas Ciardi (pronounced CHAR-dee; born August 19, 1961) is an American film producer and former Major League Baseball pitcher. He is currently the Founder and  CEO of Apex Entertainment. Mark has a rich breadth of experience as a Film Executive, and Producer.  Apex Entertainment is an independent content production firm that also serves as a financier for media properties. Prior to Apex, Ciardi was the co-founder of Mayhem Pictures that had an overall first look deal with Walt Disney Studios for twelve years. At Mayhem, Ciardi produced several sports films for Walt Disney Pictures including The Rookie, Miracle, Invincible, The Game Plan, Secretariat, Million Dollar Arm, McFarland, USA, and Safety. Awaiting release is the worldwide best-selling novel, Fallen.  He also produced the Emmy Award-winning, ESPN 30 for 30 documentary titled Big Shot.

A native of Piscataway, New Jersey, Ciardi was an All-State high school pitcher, graduating from Piscataway Township High School as part of the class of 1979.

He continued his baseball career at the University of Maryland, where he earned his Bachelor of Science degree in Business Administration. He was drafted in 1983 by the Milwaukee Brewers organization and was called up to the major leagues in 1987. He retired the following year due to an injury.

Ciardi is a member of the Academy of Motion Picture Arts and Sciences and serves on the board of trustees at the University of Maryland.  Mark is married with two children and resides in Los Angeles.

Filmography 
He was a producer in all films unless otherwise noted.

Film

As an actor

Television

Major League Baseball career 

Ciardi played for the Milwaukee Brewers in 1987. He opened the season on the Milwaukee Brewers roster in which they started the season with 13 consecutive wins, winning the eighth game in that streak against the Orioles.  That winning streak is a record that still stands today.  Ciardi remained in the big leagues for one month that year then retired the following year due to a shoulder injury.

References

External links 

1961 births
Living people
American expatriate baseball players in Canada
Baseball players from New Jersey
Beloit Brewers players
Denver Zephyrs players
El Paso Diablos players
Film producers from New Jersey
Major League Baseball pitchers
Milwaukee Brewers players
Paintsville Brewers players
People from Piscataway, New Jersey
Piscataway High School alumni
Sportspeople from New Brunswick, New Jersey
Stockton Ports players
Vancouver Canadians players
Maryland Terrapins baseball players